Sex ratio is used to describe the ratio of females to males in a population. In India, the sex ratio has been estimated via a number of methods and data sets including the decennial censuses, the National Family Health Surveys (NFHS), the Civil Registration System, the Sample Registration System and the Health Management Information System. In 2014, the ratio of female births per 1000 male births varied from 887 to 918 using these estimates. According to the NFHS-4 (2015–16) sex ratio of the total population (females per 1,000 males) was 991 (with an urban ratio of 956 and a rural ratio of 1,009).

In 2011–2013, it was revealed through a population census with the Sample Registration System (SRS) that the sex ratio of India was 909 females per 1000 of males. It has skewed downwards from then, recording 900 females in 2013–2015 and 896 in 2015–17 per 1000 of males. Furthermore, that survey conducted with the SRS also showed Chhattisgarh as the highest sex ratio at 961, while Haryana was recorded the lowest at 831.

The male-skew in India's sex ratio has increased since the early 20th century. In 1901 there were 3.2 million fewer women than men in India, but by the 2001 Census the disparity had increased by more than a factor of 10, to 35 million. This increase has been variously attributed to female infanticide, selective abortions (aided by increasing access to prenatal sex discernment procedures), and female child neglect. It has been suggested that the motivation for this selection against female children is due to the lower status and perceived usefulness of women in India's patriarchal society.

Ranking of states and union territories 

In the table below, the rank numbers represented by 'S' are for states while 'UT' are for union territories. The data in the table is based on the population census of 2001 and 2011.

Notes

See also 

 Gender Development Index
 List of countries by sex ratio
 Child sex ratio
 List of countries by Social Progress Index
 International rankings of India
 Women in India
 Female infanticide in India
 Female foeticide in India

References

Bibliography

Further reading 
(2011 figures)
 

 

Demographics of India
Lists of subdivisions of India
India, sex ratio